Abu Ali Express (In Hebrew אבו עלי אקספרס) is an influential Israeli channel which covers Arab affairs on social media, including Telegram and Twitter, as well as on its own website. In spite of its Arabic pseudonym, the page was created by Israeli citizen Gilad Cohen,

in 2018, About two years after the creation of the channel, Cohen was hired by the Israeli Defense Forces (IDF) to run the channel as a psychological warfare tool. After Israeli newspaper Haaretz revealed that the channel operator was working for the IDF, the publication of Cohen's name was initially banned by a censorship decision of Israel's military justice, on the grounds that Cohen had access to sensitive information and performed a sensitive role. A few weeks later, however, the IDF changed its position, claiming that Cohen had never been exposed to any classified information, and the censorship on his name was lifted.

As of September 2022, it was the Telegram channel with the most views per post in Israel. Stories first published by Abu Ali Express have been often reproduced in the mainstream Israeli media, including in Maariv, Globes, Ynet, Arutz Sheva, as well as on Israeli television.

History 
According to Middle East Eye, Cohen was hired by Major General Herzi Halevi soon after the outbreak of the Great March of Return when masses of Palestinians in Gaza began marching in protest demonstrations along the Gaza-Israeli border. The page "Abu Ali Express" first appeared as an "alternative news source" on "Arab affairs" on Facebook in 2018; shortly after, the page was removed from Facebook, and a new account was then opened on Telegram; two Twitter accounts – one in Hebrew, one in English – followed. For the following two years, the pages grew to over 100,000 followers, with its followers led to believe "Abu Ali" was actually a member of the Israeli Arab community.

In May 2021, during the Israeli-Gaza war, the channel hit a record of 6.7 million views per day, posting many exclusive articles during the fighting, which were then cited by many media outlets.

Shortly after, Israeli newspaper Haaretz revealed "Abu Ali Express" was actually a psychological warfare channel run by Israeli Gilad Cohen, at the time a paid consultant to the Israel Defense Forces, who had chosen "Abu Ali" as a pseudonym.

The IDF's psyops account has been the source of a number of noteworthy reports that were afterwards cited by other media. Abu Ali Express was, for example, the source for the report that Qatari funds were entering the Gaza Strip in suitcases. Before it was revealed that the page was run by one of its paid consultants, Israel Defense Forces' spokespersons have themselves recommended Abu Ali Express as a source of information concerning the situation in Gaza.

Prior to the disclosure of the page's connection to the Israel Defense Forces, Abu Ali Express has been critical of Israeli journalists who expressed criticism of the way the IDF conducted operations in Gaza. The page was also often critical of journalists who question the army. When the military correspondent for Walla, Amir Bohbot, wrote that the army's response to Gaza rocket fire has been weak, his opinion was dismissed in an Abu Ali article bearing the heading: "Israeli reporters in the service of the enemy", characterizing Bohbot as a "vehicle of Hamas propaganda".

The identity of the creator of "Abu Ali Express" 
In 2021, Israeli newspaper Haaretz revealed that the page was run by an Israeli named Gilad Cohen, who at the time was working as a "psyops" (psychological warfare) operator, paid by the Israel Defense Forces. Cohen's job was to identify and analyze trends and turning points among the Palestinians, especially in Gaza. The channel didn't state that it was run by a paid consultant to the IDF, and the Israeli army also did not disclose its cooperation with Cohen.

Still according to Haaretz, Cohen had initially served as a junior officer in the Israel Defense Forces Office of the Coordinator of Government Activities in the Territories (COGAT). Until after Haaretz's revealing of Abu Ali's real identity, the channel hadn't stated that it was run by a paid consultant to the IDF, and the Israeli army also had never disclosed Gilad Cohen worked for it.

After the publication in Haaretz, two associations of Israeli journalists contacted Deputy Chief of Staff Halevi to receive explanations about the defamation of colleagues by someone who served as a consciousness consultant to senior IDF officers. At the time, the Israeli Defense Forces informed the Israeli journalists that they were officially forbidden to publish Gilad Cohen's name in Israeli media, by a   censorship order issued by Israel's military justice, on the grounds that Cohen had been exposed to sensitive information and performed a sensitive role. A few weeks later, however, the IDF changed its position, claiming that Cohen had never been exposed to any classified information, and the censorship on his name was lifted.

Criticism 
Shortly after Israeli newspaper Haaretz found out that the popular channel was actually a psychological warfare channel run by Israeli Gilad Cohen, at the time a paid consultant to the Israel Defense Forces, the newspaper dedicated an editorial to it, regretting that "as if it were not enough that the IDF is using taxpayers’ money to pay the director of a private news channel for psyops, it emerges that the channel does not confine itself to disseminating information but also attacks Israeli journalists". Further down, the newspaper regretted that such criticism of part of the Israeli media had been "done by a news channel operated by someone the IDF hired as an adviser for psychological warfare on the social networks".

References

Propaganda television broadcasts
Psychological warfare
False flag operations
Hebrew-language websites
Israeli news websites